Landwind is an automobile marque owned by the Chinese automaker Jiangling Motor Holding (JMH), a joint venture between Jiangxi Guokong Automotive Investment Corporation (50%), Jiangling Motors Corporation Group (25%) and Changan Automobile (25%).

History
Landwind traces its origins back to 1998 when the then-chairman of JMCG, Sun Min, established Jiangling Lufeng (Landwind) Automobile Co., Ltd. His intention was to create an independent marque to strengthen JMCG's own technical development and reduce its dependence on Ford and Isuzu. While the cars would be designed by Lufeng, the production would be made on Isuzu's production lines. Ford opposed the project and it eventually was abandoned. Landwinds were on sale by 2002 and the marque was relaunched in November 2004 by Jiangling Motor Holding.

The Landwind X5 debuted at the Guangzhou Auto Show in November 2012.

Products
Landwind's current range of products comprises the following models:
Landwind X2 (2017–present) – CUV
Landwind X5 (2013–present) – CUV
Landwind X8 (2009–present) – SUV
Landwind Xiaoyao (2018–present) – Compact CUV
Landwind Rongyao (2019–present)

Landwind's former products comprise the following models:
Landwind X6 (2005-2016) – SUV
Landwind X7 (2015–2019) – CUV
Landwind X9 (2001-2009) – SUV
Landwind CV9 (2005-2011) – Compact MPV
Landwind Forward (2006-2011) – Sedan

Landwind products in development include a large SUV codenamed E32 planned to be positioned above the Landwind X5 and originally intended for launch in China in 2014.

Sales
''

Conflict with JLR
In 2011, the complaint was dismissed.

In 2016, JLR sued Jiangling Motor Holding at the Beijing Chaoyang District Court for unfair competition and copyright infringement, as it alleged the Landwind X7 design was a copy of the Land Rover Evoque. In 2019, the Court dismissed the copyright infringement case, as both the Jiangling Holding and JLR intellectual property claims in China for the vehicle had been made improperly and were invalid within the country. As for the unfair competition case, the Court ruled in favour of JLR, and the X7s were temporarily banned from being sold and produced in China, although Jiangling Holding may appeal the verdict. Media outlets erroneously reported that JRL had won the copyright infringement case, following a JLR press release, and that the company being sued was Jiangling Motors. Jiangling Motors published a press release denying it was involved in the proceedings. Later, as JLR partially fixed its press release indicating the company it had sued was Jiangling Motor Holding instead of Jiangling Motors, news agency Reuters corrected its newswire on that point, although it did not apologise for not fact-checking JLR's information.

References

External links
Official website 
Official website for Europe

Car manufacturers of China
Chinese brands
Vehicle manufacturing companies established in 2004
Jiangling Motors Corporation Group
Changan Automobile